The Apostolic Nunciature to Guinea-Bissau is an ecclesiastical office of the Catholic Church in Guinea-Bissau. It is a diplomatic post of the Holy See, whose representative is called the Apostolic Nuncio with the rank of an ambassador. The nuncio resides in Senegal.

List of papal representatives to Guinea-Bissau
Apostolic Delegates
Luigi Barbarito (5 April 1975 - 10 June 1978)
Luigi Dossena (24 October 1978 - 30 December 1985)
Pablo Puente Buces (15 March 1986 - 31 July 1989)
Apostolic Pro-Nuncio
Antonio Maria Vegliò (21 October 1989 - 2 October 1997)
Apostolic Nuncios 
Jean-Paul Gobel (6 December 1997 - 31 October 2001)
Giuseppe Pinto (5 March 2002 - 6 December 2007)
Luis Mariano Montemayor (17 September 2008 – 22 June 2015)
Michael Banach (22 August 2016 – 3 May 2022)
Waldemar Stanisław Sommertag (6 September 2022 – present)

References

 
Guinea-Bissau
Guinea-Bissau–Holy See relations
Holy See